The Plot is an album by Italian jazz trumpeter and composer Enrico Rava recorded in 1976 and released on the ECM label.

Reception
The Allmusic review by Michael G. Nastos awarded the album 4 stars noting the album's "Original ideas and compositions".

Track listing
All compositions by Enrico Rava except as indicated
 "Tribe" - 6:56 
 "On the Red Side of the Street" (Enrico Rava, Graciela Rava) - 5:28 
 "Amici" - 9:08 
 "Dr. Ra and Mr. Va" - 6:45 
 "Foto di Famiglia" (John Abercrombie, Enrico Rava) - 2:26 
 "The Plot" - Rava 15:00
Recorded at Talent Studio in Oslo, Norway in August 1976

Personnel
Enrico Rava - trumpet
John Abercrombie - electric guitar, acoustic guitar
Palle Danielsson - bass
Jon Christensen - drums

References

ECM Records albums
Enrico Rava albums
1977 albums
Albums produced by Manfred Eicher